Forest Hill Cemetery is a historic cemetery located in Greencastle Township, Putnam County, Indiana. It was established in 1865, and is a 133-acre city cemetery for Greencastle, Indiana.  Notable features include the Forest Hill Abbey (1931), four family crypts (c. 1880), the Soldier's Monument (1870), DAR Monument (1915), and the cemetery layout and soldier's section.

It was listed on the National Register of Historic Places in 2015.

Notable interments
 Thomas Bowman, Methodist Episcopal bishop
 Albertus Theodore Briggs (1862–1937), Methodist Episcopal minister
 Pearl Bryan (–1896), murder victim
 Ed Eiteljorge (1871–1942), American baseball player
 Courtland C. Gillen (1880–1954), U.S. Representative from Indiana, judge and lawyer
 John Hanna (1827–1882), U.S. Representative and U.S. Attorney from Indiana, mayor of Greencastle
 Courtland C. Matson (1841–1915), U.S. Representative from Indiana
 Finis McLean (1806–1881), U.S. Representative from Kentucky
 Cyrus Nutt (1814–1875), president of Indiana University
 John Clark Ridpath (1840–1900), author and educator

References

External links
 
 

Cemeteries on the National Register of Historic Places in Indiana
Gothic Revival architecture in Indiana
Art Deco architecture in Indiana
1865 establishments in Indiana
Buildings and structures in Putnam County, Indiana
National Register of Historic Places in Putnam County, Indiana